Seven Separate Fools is the eighth studio album by American rock band Three Dog Night. Released in 1972, the album reached number six on the US Billboard 200, becoming the band's highest-charting album. The LP version of the album was released with seven large playing cards (each nearly 12 inches in height) as an extra bonus.

Beach Boys founder Brian Wilson, who contributed "Time to Get Alone" to the pre-TDN vocal trio Redwood, placed the LP at No. 3 among his all-time Top Ten favorite records in a 2016 conversation with Esquire's Middle East branch. Wilson succinctly stated, "Danny Hutton’s vocals are truly on point."

Track listing
"Black and White" (David I. Arkin, Earl Robinson) – 3:51
"My Old Kentucky Home (Turpentine and Dandelion Wine)" (Randy Newman) – 3:08
"Prelude to Morning" (Jimmy Greenspoon) – 2:04
"Pieces of April" (Dave Loggins) – 4:10
"Going in Circles" (Jaiananda, Ted Myers) – 3:06
"Chained" (Russ Ballard) – 5:14
"Tulsa Turnaround" (Larry Collins, Alex Harvey) – 3:41
"In Bed" (Tom Baird, Lynn Henderson, Wes Henderson) – 3:58
"Freedom for the Stallion" (Allen Toussaint) – 3:41
"The Writing's on the Wall" (Domenic Troiano) – 3:17
"Midnight Runaway" (Gary Itri) – 5:28

Personnel
Mike Allsup – guitar
Jimmy Greenspoon – keyboards
Danny Hutton – lead vocals (tracks 1, 10), background vocals
Chuck Negron – lead vocals (tracks 4, 11), background vocals
Joe Schermie – bass guitar
Floyd Sneed – drums
Cory Wells – lead vocals (tracks 2, 7), background vocals
with:
Patrick Sullivan - cello on "Pieces of April"
Gary Itri - acoustic guitar on "Midnight Runaway"

Production
Producer: Richard Podolor
Ed Caraeff - art direction, photography, design concept
David Larkham - graphics, typography, design concept

Charts

Singles – Billboard (United States)

Certifications

References

1972 albums
Three Dog Night albums
Albums produced by Richard Podolor
Dunhill Records albums